Along the internal surface of the occipital bone, at the point of intersection of the four divisions of the cruciform eminence, is the internal occipital protuberance. Running transversely on either side is a groove for the transverse sinus.

Additional images

See also
 External occipital protuberance

References

External links

 
 Diagram at uni-mainz.de 

Bones of the head and neck